Zimbabwe is a nation that has competed at two Hopman Cup tournaments and first competed in the 11th Hopman Cup in 1999. Both times Zimbabwe has competed, it has lost in the qualification play-offs.

Players
This is a list of players who have played for Zimbabwe in the Hopman Cup.

Results

1 Despite losing in the qualification play-offs, Zimbabwe replaced the injured Spanish team for their final tie against South Africa.

References

Hopman Cup teams
Hopman Cup
Hopman Cup